Henry Ingott Woodruff<ref>The Oxford Companion to the American Theatre,2nd Edition p.725, c.1992 by Gerald Bordman</ref> (June 1, 1869 – October 6, 1916) was an American stage and silent film actor. He's remembered for starring in the original Broadway play Brown of Harvard in 1905. 

Early life
He was born the son of Samuel V. Woodruff, a wealthy New York businessman, and first appeared on stage at nine in the 1879 juvenile company of H.M.S. Pinafore. He acted with Daniel E. Bandmann and Adelaide Neilson. He later attended Harvard University and after graduating returned to acting.

Career
In 1893, Woodruff was in the first U.S. presentation of Brandon Thomas's Charley's Aunt, playing the part of Charley Wykeham. Over time he showed his range in Shakespeare, musical comedy, drama and farces. He appeared on stage with Julia Marlowe, William Collier Sr. and Amelia Bingham. In 1902 he was in the cast of Mary of Magdala with Mrs. Fiske and Rose Eytinge. In 1906 he scored a huge personal hit on Broadway in Brown of Harvard. Woodruff had attended Harvard and the play was filmed several times.

In 1915, Woodruff appeared in two silent films, A Man and His Mate and The Beckoning Flame'', the latter apparently survives in the Library of Congress.

Membership of The Lambs
Woodruff was elected to The Lambs Club in 1890 and later served terms as Boy (vice president).

Death
Woodruff died of Bright's Disease in New York.

References

External links

Portraits, New York City Public Library, Billy Rose collection
Portrait gallery (University of Washington, Sayre collection)
"The Bright Stars of Yesterday" life of Henry Woodruff
"Aloha" Hawaiian style home built on Nantucket by Woodruff in 1904 and sold by him in 1916

1869 births
1916 deaths
Male actors from Hartford, Connecticut
American male stage actors
American male silent film actors
Deaths from nephritis
Harvard University alumni
20th-century American male actors
Members of The Lambs Club